Ronald Morrison Aitken (7 May 1920 – 12 August 1987) was a Scottish footballer who played for Hibernian and Dumbarton.

References

1920 births
1987 deaths
Scottish footballers
Hibernian F.C. players
Dumbarton F.C. players
Scottish Football League players
Association football outside forwards